Charles Greenfield (c. 1885 – 1979) was an American engineer and hospital administrator. Trained as an engineer in New York City, Greenfield later became the first administrator of the Shore Road Hospital. Earlier he "helped design and build the Coney Island boardwalk."

Career
Greenfield was a civil engineer with degrees from Cooper Union (1908)
and Brooklyn Polytechnic Institute (1912). Although he used this knowledge in the design and building of the Coney Island Boardwalk and "the first road between Little Neck and Great Neck, L.I." he is best known for converting a mansion in Brooklyn into Shore Road Hospital and then directing it for 43 years.

Prior to dying at age 94, he was the only living alumnus of his Cooper and Poly graduating classes.

Family
When he died at age 94 in 1979, his living family members included
his wife, two daughters, "three grandchildren, and 
two great-grandchildren.

References

1880s births
1979 deaths
Cooper Union alumni
Polytechnic Institute of New York University alumni